The women's K-1 500 metres sprint canoeing event at the 2020 Summer Olympics took place on 4 and 5 August 2021 at the Sea Forest Waterway. At least 13 canoeists from at least 13 nations competed.

Background
This was the 19th appearance of the event, the only event to have appeared every Summer Games since the introduction of women's canoeing in 1948.

The reigning World Champion (who also won the 2015 World Championship and the bronze medal at the 2016 Games) is Lisa Carrington of New Zealand, who earned a place for her NOC and has been selected to compete. The reigning Olympic champion is Danuta Kozák of Hungary, who finished third at the World Championships to earn Hungary a quota place.

Qualification

A National Olympic Committee (NOC) could qualify one place in the event, though could enter up to 2 boats if it earned enough quota places through other women's kayak events. A total of 13 qualification places were available, initially allocated as follows:

 1 place for the host nation, provided it qualified no other women's kayak places
 5 places awarded through the 2019 ICF Canoe Sprint World Championships
 6 places awarded through continental tournaments, 1 per continent except 2 places for Europe
 1 place awarded through the 2021 Canoe Sprint World Cup Stage 2.

Qualifying places were awarded to the NOC, not to the individual canoeist who earned the place.

Japan earned a women's kayak place in the K-1 200 metres, so that quota place was added to the World Championships (making 6). Carrington's and Khudzenka's quota places went through the reallocation process because they also qualified in K-4 boats. That process resulted in an additional place in K-1 500 metres, which went to Simon. The World Championships quota places were allocated as follows:

Continental and World Cup places:

Nations with women's kayak quota spots from the K-1 200 metres, K-2 500 metres, or K-4 500 metres could enter (additional) boats as well.

Competition format
Sprint canoeing uses a four-round format for events with at least 11 boats, with heats, quarterfinals, semifinals, and finals. The specifics of the progression format depend on the number of boats ultimately entered.

The course is a flatwater course 9 metres wide. The name of the event describes the particular format within sprint canoeing. The "K" format means a kayak, with the canoeist sitting, using a double-bladed paddle to paddle, and steering with a foot-operated rudder (as opposed to a canoe, with a kneeling canoeist, single-bladed paddle, and no rudder). The "1" is the number of canoeists in each boat. The "500 metres" is the distance of each race.

Schedule
The event was held over two consecutive days, with two rounds per day. All sessions started at 9:30 a.m. local time, though there are multiple events with races in each session.

Results

Heats
The first three canoers from each heat advance to the semifinals. The remaining competitors compete in the quarterfinals.

Heat 1

Heat 2

Heat 3

Heat 4

Heat 5

Heat 6

Quarterfinals
Progression: 1st-3rd to SF, rest out.

Quarterfinal 1

Quarterfinal 2

Quarterfinal 3

Quarterfinal 4

Semifinals
Progression System: 1st-2nd to Final A, 3rd-4th to Final B, 5th-6th to Final C, rest out.

Semifinal 1

Semifinal 2

Semifinal 3

Semifinal 4

Finals

Final A

Final B

Final C

References

Women's K-1 500 metres
Women's events at the 2020 Summer Olympics